Lady Lumley's School is a coeducational secondary school and sixth form located in Pickering, North Yorkshire, England. It was founded in Thornton-le-Dale in 1670.

It was endowed by deed of Frances, Viscountess Lumley, an ancestor of the Earl of Scarborough, in 1657, and the buildings completed in about 1680.

It has school links worldwide, particularly within Tanzania, Morocco, China and France.

The school has been awarded Sportsmark 2008, an iNET qualification, Specialist Schools and Academies Trust, a British Schools Orienteering award and was classified as a Healthy School. In 2010 Ofsted Inspection Report rated Lady Lumley's School as overall grade 2 (good).

School history
The current co-educational school was originally two single-sex grammar schools, one in Thornton-le-Dale and one on Middleton Road in Pickering, both called Lady Lumley's Grammar School. They were amalgamated in 1904/05, on the Pickering site. In 1864, the school at Thornton had 26 pupils, all boys.

During the Second World War, pupils from Middlesbrough High School for Girls were evacuated to Pickering, and shared the school with the Lady Lumley's pupils.

In the 1940s, pupils carried out an archaeological excavation of the nearby mediaeval hospital of St Nicholas.

In the first half of the twentieth century, the then headmaster of the school, F Austin Hyde, was an expert on the dialect of the area.

Previously a community school administered by North Yorkshire County Council, in May 2021 Lady Lumley's School converted to academy status. It is now sponsored by the Coast and Vale Learning Trust.

Notable former pupils
 Richard Buck, athlete
 Duncan Dowson, Professor of Mechanical Engineering
 John Healey, Labour Party MP for Wentworth and Dearne (1997–present)
 Craig and Chris Short, footballers

References

External links
 Official school website
 Headteacher's blog post on twentieth-century school history
 Memories of Lady Lumley’s School, Pickering, Yorkshire 1958-65

Secondary schools in North Yorkshire
Academies in North Yorkshire
Pickering, North Yorkshire